John James MacDonald  (May 19, 1906 – February 1, 1991) was a British-born American foley artist, voice actor, musician and conductor. He was the original head of the Disney sound effects department, and was also the 2nd official voice of Mickey Mouse from 1947 to 1976 and again in 1978 and 1987 after Walt Disney stopped playing the character and before Wayne Allwine became the third voice of Mickey in 1977.

Early life 
MacDonald was born on May 19, 1906, in Crewe, Cheshire. His parents were Richard William MacDonald and Minnie Hall. The family emigrated to America when MacDonald was 1 month old. They travelled via the SS Haverford from Liverpool, England, arriving in Pennsylvania fifteen days later.

Career

Sound effects 
As a young man, MacDonald landed a job as a musician on the Dollar Steam Ship Lines, which in 1934 led to an opportunity to record music for a Disney cartoon. He went on to secure a permanent contract with Disney, becoming head of the sound department.

In addition to directing sounds for animated shorts as aurally complicated as Mickey's Trailer (1938), he developed many original inventions and contraptions to achieve expressive sounds for characters like Casey Jr., the circus train engine from Dumbo (1941); Evinrude the dragonfly from The Rescuers (1977); the bees in Winnie the Pooh and the Honey Tree (1966); and Buzz-buzz (later called "Spike"), the bee who gets the best of Donald Duck in his 1950s short films. He also made the sound effects of Tick Tock the crocodile from Peter Pan (1953) and Dragon Maleficent from Sleeping Beauty (1959) by using castanets.

MacDonald also added voice effects, like on-screen humming for Kirk Douglas in 20,000 Leagues Under the Sea (1954).

The majority of his effects are available on Cartoon Trax Volume 1, from The Hollywood Edge, which was released in 1992. A few of his other effects showed up on other non-Disney sound libraries, such as the International Sound Effects Library and the Hanna-Barbera Sound Effects Library, both from Sound Ideas. Some other releases containing MacDonald's sound effects include a few specialty sound effect record releases from Disneyland Records, most notably Chilling, Thrilling Sounds of the Haunted House.

By the time of his death, he was preparing to work on the sounds for the Splash Mountain attraction in Tokyo Disneyland and Walt Disney World.

Voice acting 
James MacDonald did the first test yodeling for the dwarfs in Snow White and the Seven Dwarfs (1937) before they brought in professional yodelers as well as doing some sounds for Dopey such as his hiccuping and sobbing.

By 1947, Walt Disney was getting too busy and hoarse from smoking to continue voicing Mickey Mouse, so he offered the job to MacDonald. MacDonald voiced Mickey Mouse until his retirement in 1976, at which point he was replaced by his sound effects protégée, Wayne Allwine, for The New Mickey Mouse Club. However, MacDonald returned to voice Mickey again for an appearance at the 50th Academy Awards in 1978 and the opening of Star Tours at Disneyland in 1987. Despite formally retiring, MacDonald remained involved with several Disney productions; he voiced Evinrude from The Rescuers (1977) and was often consulted for sound-effects projects.

MacDonald was the original voice actor for Chip, one half of the duo Chip and Dale. He provided the voice of Lumpjaw in Fun and Fancy Free, Jaq and Gus the mice and Bruno the dog in Cinderella (1950), the Dormouse in Alice in Wonderland (1951), Humphrey the Bear, the howling of the dogs at the pound (along with Thurl Ravenscroft) in Lady and the Tramp (1955), the Wolf in The Sword in the Stone (1963), and the hyena in Bedknobs and Broomsticks (1971). He appeared in the film Toby Tyler (1960) as the Circus Band Drummer, but was uncredited and appeared in Fantasia (1940) as one of the musicians.

MacDonald played drums in the Firehouse Five Plus Two jazz band. He played with the band on and off from its inception until it disbanded in the early 1970s.

Personal life 
MacDonald married Sarah Roberta Cullen in 1936, they remained married until his death in 1991.

Death 
MacDonald died of heart failure at his home in Glendale, California on February 1, 1991, at the age of 84, he was buried in Glendale's Forest Lawn Memorial Park Cemetery.

Filmography

Sound effects work

Film

Music

Acting credits

Film

Television

References

External links 
 
 Biography at Disney Legends website
 
 The Voice of Mickey Mouse at The Scotsman website
 The Voice of Mickey Mouse at BBC Radio Scotland

1906 births
1991 deaths
20th-century American male actors
20th-century Scottish male actors
American male voice actors
Animal impersonators
Burials at Forest Lawn Memorial Park (Glendale)
Dixieland drummers
Firehouse Five Plus Two members
Male actors from Cheshire
People from Crewe
English emigrants to the United States
English male voice actors
British sound designers
Sound effects artists
Walt Disney Animation Studios people